Brianna Glenn (born April 18, 1980) is an American long jumper. She finished ninth at the 2002 World Cup and seventh at the 2006 World Athletics Final. Her personal best jump is 6.87 metres, achieved in June 2011 at the United States Olympic Training Center in Chula Vista, California.

Brianna also holds a personal best in the 100m of 11.10 seconds.

Brianna is an active model and has been in a Sports Illustrated Budweiser campaign as an Olympic hopeful. The campaign was a part of the Sports Illustrated swimsuit edition in 2008.

External links
 BriannaGlenn.net
 
 
 Interview with Brianna Glenn at My Athletic Life

1980 births
Living people
American female long jumpers
21st-century American women